The Hoya of Baza is a valley in the northern part of the province of Granada, Andalusia, southern Spain, named after the town and former bishopric Baza, Granada. It is one of the series of valleys forming the Surco Intrabético.

It formed during the Alpine orogeny of the Cenozoic Era. Initially, it was a large lake that filled in with Paleogene, Neogene and Quaternary materials. It was originally part of the Mediterranean basin, connected to the sea by the corridor of the Almanzora River.

The term "hoya" literally means "trough" and refers to the boxed in character of the area.

The Cerro Jabalcón separates the Hoya of Baza from the Hoya of Guadix.

The Hoya is generally relatively flat, but cut by a dense network of rivers that form a maze of gullies and ravines known as badlands.

Apart from the fertile plains and other places that have been worked, the territory is steppe, bearing only shrubbery typical of cold regions.

See also 
 Baza, Granada

Notes 

Geography of the Province of Granada
Valleys of Spain
Landforms of Andalusia